Radio Waves is the final studio album by Norwegian rock band Seigmen. It is sung entirely in English. The album came in two editions: a limited edition black jewel case, and a transparent jewel case.

Track listing
 "Performance Alpha" - 4:42
 "The World Revolves Around You" - 5:16
 "Universal" - 4:56
 "The Modern End" - 4:38
 "Bloodprint" - 5:10
 "Neon Sun" - 4:38
 "Guilt" - 5:00
 "Trampoline" - 6:09
 "Mercurial" - 6:43
 "Performance Bravo" - 7:23

Musicians
Alex Møklebust - Lead vocals
Kim Ljung - Bass guitar, vocals
Noralf Ronthi - drums
Marius Roth Christensen - Electric guitar
Sverre Økshoff - Electric guitar

1997 albums
Seigmen albums